"Someday" is a song released from Rob Thomas' second album, Cradlesong. It was released as the album's third single (second outside of Australia) in September 2009 only in digital format, and followed as a physical release in December 2009.

It debuted at No. 93 on the Billboard Hot 100, peaking at No. 59. It has since become Thomas's third career No. 1 on Billboard's Adult Top 40 chart as a solo artist, and fourth overall, also extending his top-five singles streak on the format to seven (eight when including his collaborative hit "Smooth").

Music video
The music video was released on 15 September 2009 and is directed by Alan Ferguson.
It captures Rob Thomas wandering through a parade in downtown New York City.

Chart positions

Weekly charts

Year-end charts

Sales and Certifications

References

Rob Thomas (musician) songs
2009 singles
Song recordings produced by Matt Serletic
Songs written by Rob Thomas (musician)
Rock ballads
Songs written by Matt Serletic
2009 songs
Atlantic Records singles
Songs written by Shy Carter
Music videos directed by Alan Ferguson (director)